Lutine may refer to:

 HMS Lutine, a frigate of the Royal Navy, formerly of the French navy
 HMS Lutines bell (Lutine Bell) preserved at Lloyd's of London
 , various yachts of the Lloyd's of London Yacht Club
 Lutine, a female imp in French folklore, variation of "Lutin"
 Lutein, a carotenoid